Mast is a 1999 Indian Hindi musical romantic film directed by Ram Gopal Varma. This was the debut film for Aftab Shivdasani as a lead actor with Urmila Matondkar as the leading actress and pair opposite to him. Upon release, the film was a flop at the box office. although Shivdasani won the Zee Cine Award for Best Male Debut and the Star Screen Award for Most Promising Newcomer – Male for his performance

Synopsis
Kittu (Aftab Shivdasani) is an arts student in Pune and is madly in love with actress and film star Malika (Urmila Matondkar). He has posters up on his wall and goes to all of her movies, and even fantasizes that she is there with him when he is watching these items. His father, concerned with his son's declining exam scores, confronts Kittu on his obsession and later tears down the posters. To Kittu, this is almost as bad as murder, and decides to move out and away to Mumbai, where the star, herself, lives.

Unknowing of where to go, he goes to her bungalow, but the security guard shoos him away. He finds a job at a nearby cafe. After interacting with Malika, Kittu soon finds that she is not the girl that he had pictured from her posters and movies. Being a simple orphan, exploited by her evil uncle and his family, Kittu begins to feel sorry for her and even more in love although for an unknown reason she does not report her uncle's actions to the police.

A series of events lead him to the point where he decides to convince her to run away with him. But with her being such a famous icon, Kittu soon finds it harder than he had thought to get away. The police are looking for her as is her family; and after a visit to the home of Kittu's family, as well, they are soon helping Malika enjoy her newfound freedom.

Things take a turn for the worse when Mr. Mathur is taken into custody for allegedly housing the "kidnapped" Malika. The police beat Kittu for information. Malika turns herself in to save them, and she tells the cops that Kittu rescued her and that her uncle is the one who has ill-treated her. The police then take her uncle into custody and whack him.

Malika then returns home, leaving Kittu to his life with his family and Nisha believing that they are in love. Kittu returns home as well and is devastated that she left him without an explanation or goodbye. They visit her on set one day to see that she has returned to her old life, uncle-free, but this meeting is an uncomfortable one. Through her awkward goodbye, Kittu then realizes that she believes that Kittu is going to marry Nisha.

After this realization, he then runs to Malika's dressing room from the cab to tell her of his love and the fact that she has assumed wrong. They have a heartfelt conversation of love and life, and Malika goes on to explain that she thinks that Nisha and Kittu have a love that she cannot come between. She then asks him not to see her anymore and he runs to Nisha to tell her of this belief. After hearing this, Nisha explains the situation that she loves Kittu, but Kittu has always been in love with Malika. Malika and Kittu embrace to express their love.

The closing scene shows that they get married and everyone in the story was there, including his coworkers from the cafe and the taxi driver. The wicked uncle is nowhere to be seen.

Cast

Soundtrack
All songs were composed by Sandeep Chowta and written by Nitin Raikwar.

References

External links
 

1999 films
1990s Hindi-language films
Films directed by Ram Gopal Varma
Films scored by Sandeep Chowta
1990s romantic musical films
Indian romantic musical films